The Survival of Kindness is a 2022 Australian drama film written, produced and directed by Rolf de Heer. An allegory for racism, the film follows BlackWoman, who is abandoned in a cage on a trailer in the middle of the desert. Her escape leads to a city, recapture and tragedy. It had its world premiere at Adelaide Film Festival on 23 October 2022, and had its international premiere in competition at the 73rd Berlin International Film Festival on 17 February 2023, where it competed for Golden Bear and won the FIPRESCI Award for Best Film.

Cast
 Mwajemi Hussein (BlackWoman)
 Deepthi Sharma (BrownGirl)
 Darsan Sharma (BrownBoy)
 Gary Waddell
 Natasha Wanganeen

Production
The film is produced by Julie Byrne and Rolf de Heer under the banner of Triptych Pictures and Vertigo Productions and bankrolled by Screen Australia, Screen Tasmania, Adelaide Film Festival and South Australian Film Corporation. Umbrella Entertainment is taking care of distribution in Australia. Elise Archer, Minister for the Arts, Tasmania, wrote on her website, "We have invested $90,000 in the film (The Survival of Kindness), through Screen Tasmania, which was filmed in both Tasmania and South Australia.

Reception

On the review aggregator Rotten Tomatoes website, the film has an approval rating of 89% based on 9 reviews, with an average rating of 6.6/10. On Metacritic, it has a weighted average score of 66 out of 100 based on 6 reviews, indicating "Generally Favorable Reviews".

David Rooney reviewing for The Hollywood Reporter at Berlin Film Festival praised the performance of Mwajemi Hussein writing, "Hussein’s unflinching performance speaks volumes, mostly without words".  Rooney found film lengthy writing, "there’s a grim inevitability to The Survival of Kindness that becomes wearing, making its 96 minutes feel longer." Calling it a outback gothic, he stated, "Some will find it immersive and others distancing; many will find it unrelentingly bleak, even infuriating in its ability to be simultaneously opaque and obvious." Peter Bradshaw of The Guardian rated the film with 3 stars out of 5 and wrote, "It is an elegant reverie about the violence and the stoicism beneath the surface of ordinary life." Wendy Ide for ScreenDaily wrote in review that the filmmaking is "striking, thought-provoking, although it rather runs out of steam and ideas in the third act." Pat Brown for Slant Magazine rated 2.5 out of 4 and praised Mwajemi Hussein writing, "Hussein is magnetic as BlackWoman". Brown opined, "An epic adventure in the guise of an arthouse flick, The Survival of Kindness makes up in visual power and moral clarity what it lacks in subtext."

Accolades

References

External links
 
 
 The Survival of Kindness at Berlinale
 The Survival of Kindness at Adelaide Film Festivals 
 

2022 films
2022 drama films
Australian drama films
Films directed by Rolf de Heer
2020s English-language films
Films about racism
Films shot in Tasmania
Films shot in South Australia